Tylwch is a small village in Powys, Wales.

Tylwch lies south of the principal town of Llanidloes on the border of Montgomeryshire and Radnorshire. It lies on the Afon Dulas, which once serviced a local woolen mill. Other early industries included West Fedw, a now disused lead mine. Tylwch was once home to Tylwch railway station, a small but locally important station which has since been closed. In 1899 the station was the scene of an accident which witnessed a collision between a mail train and an excursion train. Five people were seriously injured and a 24-year-old woman died in the incident.

References

Villages in Powys